René la taupe (English: René the mole) is a virtual French singing character created in 2009 by Fox Mobile Group studios. The character, which is in fact a groundhog, was made famous through a music for mobile phone and a music video available on the Internet. The character was created to mediate ringtones on behalf of Jamster, a distributor of content for mobile phones that had already produced Crazy Frog.

History: ringtones and singles
The first ringtone, "Merde" (English: "Shit"), whose lyrics were sometimes considered vulgar, is the most downloaded song of 2009 on the German version ("Scheiße, ich liebe dich") of Jamba. The single reached number 30 in Germany and remained nine weeks on the charts, and peaked at number 38 in Austria.

In May 2010, a second song was released, "Mignon, Mignon", which quickly became a hit. The lyrics, written by Christian Büttner, Hank Hobson and Marcello Pagin, suggest the chubby look of the animal that makes it adorable. The success of the single generated an increase of the ringtone sales, becoming one of the most downloaded of the middle of 2010 with help from Fun Radio.

Jamba, a brand of Fox Mobile Group, released a derivative version, "Mauvais, Mauvais" (English: "Bad, Bad") after the failure of the France team in the 2010 FIFA World Cup but it was the original song that ensured success. The music video is shown on the Internet and became an Internet meme.

In late August 2010, René la Taupe announced a new single, "C'est la rentrée". A Christmas song is also scheduled.

On 1 December 2011, a music video starring René la Taupe performed a French Rock version of "Jingle Bells" featuring The Chipmunks.

Reception
In late July 2010, the single reached number two on the SNEP French downloaded chart, behind Shakira's "Waka Waka (This Time for Africa)", the official song for the 2010 FIFA World Cup. It dethroned that song four weeks later. The single also entered the French physical chart at number one in late August 2010, selling 17,300 units in the first week, which was the highest weekly sales for a single since August 2008, and remained at number one for a total of thirteen weeks, as of 30 November 2010. The music video has been seen over 5 million times on YouTube in two months.

Despite its popularity, the character was controversial because some Internet users did not appreciate it: on Twitter, the groundhog received messages of hate, and on Wikipedia, the French and German articles were proposed to deletion with the main argument that it is "a short-lived phenomenon which Wikipedia does not have to promote it". However, both articles were kept.

As of August 2010, the groundhog has over 28,000 friends on Facebook.

In late August 2010, René la Taupe launched a new music video on the Internet entitled "C'est la rentrée". The song used the same tune as "Merde", the first single of the singing character, a cover of French singer Fadades.

In late October, a second single, entitled "Tu parles trop", was released. It entered as a peak of number three on the French Singles Chart, behind the former single "Mignon Mignon".

On 15 November 2010, the first album entitled Les Aventures de René la Taupe was released in France, with 15 tracks, and a DVD containing the music videos and the karaoke versions of the first four singles. The albums debuted at number 25, then dropped but reached a peak at number twenty about two months later.

Discography

Albums

Singles

1 Physical chart until 2010, physical + digital chart after 2010
2 No. 4 on the Physical chart

See also
 List of artists who reached number one on the French Singles Chart
 List of fictional moles

References

Fictional moles
Internet memes